Konarju (also Romanized as Konārjū, Kanār Jū, Kenar Joo, and Kenārjū) is a village in Bemani Rural District, Byaban District, Minab County, Hormozgan Province, Iran. At the 2006 census, its population was 876, in 182 families.

References 

Populated places in Minab County